Carey K. Jenkins (died 1987) was an American architect active in the Los Angeles area in the mid-20th century. He was the first black graduate of the University of Southern California (USC) School of Architecture. After graduating from USC in 1943, he served in the Army Air Force. He worked for A. Quincy Jones in the late 1940s.

Jenkins was known to be "politically well-connected."
The Los Angeles Tribune commented: "James Garrott, Paul R. Williams, and Carey Jenkins, are the only Negro architects ever to get a public contract in this slate ... and except for Williams they get them infrequently."

His offices were located in Beverly Hills in the late 1960s and early 1970s.

Jenkins partnered with Charles E. Fleming to complete the Martin Luther King, Jr. General Hospital in the Watts neighborhood in 1972. In the late 1970s, Jenkins-Fleming, Inc. had offices in six U.S. cities and in West Africa, and Jenkins was chairman of the board.

Buildings 
Bank of America branch, 4073 W. Washington Blvd., Los Angeles
Martin Luther King, Jr. General Hospital, 1680 E. 120th St., Los Angeles
Augustus Hawkins Psychiatric Center, 1720 E. 120th St., Los Angeles
Hubert Humphrey Comprehensive Health Center, Slauson Ave. & Main St., Los Angeles
Independent Square senior housing, 2455 S. St. Andrews Place, Los Angeles
(with Honnold & Rex) Mary McLeod Bethune Junior High School, Los Angeles

References 

American architects
Modernist architects
African-American architects
Modernist architecture in California
Year of birth missing
1987 deaths